Toccoa Airport , also known as R. G. LeTourneau Field, is a public use airport located two nautical miles (3.7 km) northeast of the central business district of Toccoa, a city in Stephens County, Georgia, United States. It is owned by the Toccoa-Stephens County Authority. According to the FAA's National Plan of Integrated Airport Systems for 2009–2013, it is categorized as a general aviation airport.

Local businessman and aviation buff R. G. LeTourneau created the airport in the late 1930s when he built two runways for his personal use. LeTourneau donated the runways to the city and county in 1961 and the airfield was named in his honor.

Facilities and aircraft 
It has two asphalt paved runways: 3/21 is 5,008 by 100 feet (1,526 x 30 m) and 9/27 is 2,951 by 50 feet (899 x 15 m).

For the 12-month period ending May 26, 2009, the airport had 26,000 general aviation aircraft operations, an average of 71 per day. At that time there were 32 aircraft based at this airport: 72% single-engine and 28% multi-engine.

References

External links 
 Toccoa Aviation, Inc., the fixed-base operator (FBO)
 Foothills Aviation / Ace Aircraft
 Toccoa RG LeTourneau Field (TOC) at Georgia DOT Airport Directory
 Aerial image as of 28 February 2000 from USGS The National Map
 
 

Airports in Georgia (U.S. state)
Buildings and structures in Stephens County, Georgia
Transportation in Stephens County, Georgia